Moneilema michelbacheri is a species of beetle in the family Cerambycidae. It was described by Linsley in 1942.

References

Moneilemini
Beetles described in 1942